De Nardi was a professional cycling team based in Italy. Founded under a Slovak license, they helped nurture talented young riders. In 2003, the merged with Team Colpack-Astro, and took on Colpack as a co-sponsor. In 2005, Italian hotel group Domina Vacanze sponsored the team, having formerly sponsored a different team. For the 2005 season the team competed in the 2005 UCI ProTour. However, they didn't have the budget of the other teams and produced very few wins. For the 2006 season, the team merged with Team Wiesenhof to create Team Milram. In 2009 an amateur team sponsored by De Nardi and Colpack emerged, now known as Team Colpack.

Notable riders
 2005
 2005
 2004–2005
 2003–2005
 2003
 2005
 2005
 2005
 2005
 2005
 2004–2005
 2003
 2005
 2005
 2005
 2004–2005
 2005
 2005
 2004
 2005
 2003–2005
 2003
 2003–2004
 2005
 2004–2005
 2003–2005

Major wins

2003
Stage 2 Giro della Liguria, Giuseppe Palumbo
Stage 4 Giro del Trentino, Michele Gobbi
Stage 21 Giro d'Italia, Serhiy Honchar
Stage 5 Tour of Austria, Matteo Carrara
Gran Premio Industria e Commercio Artigianato Carnaghese, Michele Gobbi
 Road Race Championships, Serhiy Honchar
Criterium d'Abruzzo, Matteo Carrara
Trofeo Città di Castelfidardo, Michele Gobbi
Stage 5 Tour of Qinghai Lake, Matteo Carrara
Stage 1 Tour de Pologne, Simone Cadamuro

2004
Doha GP, Simone Cadamuro
Stage 1a Settimana Internazionale di Coppi e Bartali, Graziano Gasparre
Veenendaal–Veenendaal, Simone Cadamuro
Stage 13 Giro d'Italia, Serhiy Honchar
 Time Trial Championships, Matej Jurčo
 Road Race Championships, Rafael Nuritdinov
Stage 3 Tour of Qinghai Lake, Simone Cadamuro
Giro del Friuli, Michele Gobbi

2005
Stage 3 Giro del Trentino, Serhiy Honchar
 Time Trial Championships, Matej Jurčo
 Time Trial Championships, Andriy Hrivko
Gran Premio Città di Camaiore, Maxim Iglinskiy
Stage 2 Eneco Tour, Simone Cadamuro
Coppa Ugo Agostoni, Paolo Valoti
Stage 6 Deutschland Tour, Maxim Iglinskiy
Coppa Placci, Paolo Valoti
Coppa Sabatini, Alessandro Bertolini

National champions
2003
 Ukrainian Road Race Championships, Serhiy Honchar
2004
  Slovak Time Trial Championships, Matej Jurčo
 Uzbekistan Road Race Championships, Rafael Nuritdinov
2005
 Slovak Time Trial Championships, Matej Jurčo
 Ukrainian  Time Trial Championships, Andriy Hrivko

1999 establishments in Italy
Cycling teams based in Slovakia
Cycling teams disestablished in 2005
Cycling teams established in 1999
Defunct cycling teams based in Italy
Former UCI WorldTeams